George Banfield (1888–1963) was a British film producer and director. He first entered the film industry in 1908. During the mid-1920s he began producing series of short films during the Slump of 1924. In 1926 he formed a new company British Filmcraft, and bought Walthamstow Studios. The company produced a large number of shorts, and four feature films but did not make the transition from silent to sound films. He is sometimes credited as George J. Banfield.

Selected filmography

Director
 Spangles (1928)
 Power Over Men (1929)
 The Burgomaster of Stilemonde (1929)

References

Bibliography
 Low, Rachel. The History of British Film: Volume IV, 1918–1929. Routledge, 1997.

External links

1888 births
1963 deaths
British film directors
British film producers